"Sur Lautréamont" is an essay written by French Nobel laureate J. M. G. Le Clézio.

Contents
 Section 1
 Marcel Proust, Flaubert, Préface)
 Section 2
 MAURICE, Préface
 Section 3
 ZEEV STERNHELL, LÉON POLIAKOV, ALFRED GROSSER
 Section 4
 Bourbons Tome, CLAUDE METTRA, Ouvrage couronné
 Section 5
 JULIEN GRACQ, MAURICE BLANCHOT, REGARD

Other Books  on Lautréamont by Le Clézio

Complete works 
By Lautréamont J. M. G.Le Clézio Hubert Juin, published by Éditions Gallimard, 1973 (504 pages)

Derniers poèmes en vers et en prose
Derniers poèmes en vers et en prose
By Max Jacob,Jean-Marie Gustave Le Clézio
Contributor Jean-Marie Gustave Le Clézio
Published by Gallimard, 1982
Original from the University of Michigan
Digitized Mar 26, 2008
, 978-2-07-032224-4
188 pages

La guerre

Page 70

Interview with Jean-Marie Le Clézio
Quote:"... this unconventional novelist claims to draw his inspiration not only from Lautréamont and Zola, but from Stevenson and Joyce as well. ..."

Book Reviews and Extract
A Google Book Search accesses:
 Key words and phrases
 Contents
 book review
 Find this book in a library
 Popular passages
 References from web pages
 References from books
 Other editions

Publication history

Les Cahiers du Chemin

References

1987 essays
Essays by J. M. G. Le Clézio
Works by J. M. G. Le Clézio